Ja Arthur Jahannes (August 25, 1942 – July 5, 2015) was a professor at Savannah State University in Savannah, Georgia and the pastor of the Abyssinia Missionary Baptist Church in Savannah. He was a prolific playwright, music composer, essayist, and poet, a frequent theatre director and international lecturer, and a pioneer of Black psychology.

Jahannes was raised in Baltimore. He earned a bachelor's degree from Lincoln University, a historically-black university in Pennsylvania, in 1964. He then earned two master's degrees from Hampton University in Virginia in 1966 and a doctorate in 1972 from the University of Delaware. He joined the Savannah State faculty in 1981 as dean of the School of Humanities there.

His wife, artist Clara Agüero, also worked as a professor at Savannah State.

References

1942 births
2015 deaths
African-American psychologists
20th-century American psychologists
Writers from Baltimore
Lincoln University (Pennsylvania) alumni
Hampton University alumni
University of Delaware alumni
Savannah State University faculty
Academics from Maryland
20th-century African-American people
21st-century African-American people